Sunken Rock Light is a lighthouse in Bush Island, New York. It was converted to solar power in 1988. It is maintained by the St. Lawrence Seaway Development Corporation pursuant to an agreement with the U.S. Coast Guard authorized under 14 USC 81.

References

External links
 
 Lighthouse Friends site
 
 National Park Service Historic Lighthouses
 NPS Sunken Rock 

Lighthouses completed in 1847
1847 establishments in New York (state)
Lighthouses in Jefferson County, New York